Osturňa is a village and municipality in Kežmarok District in the Prešov Region of north Slovakia. The village is traditionally inhabited by Rusyns and Gorals, as one of their westernmost settlements (together with Malá Franková and Veľká Franková).

Geography
The municipality lies at an altitude of 717 meters and covers an area of 41.237 km² . It has a population of about 329 full-time residents.

History
In historical records the village was first mentioned in 1593 and it was a part of the Kingdom of Hungary.

Economy
Locals in the past had been engaged in agriculture and pasturage. At present its proximity of Ždiar and High Tatras is an asset. Inhabitants work in industrial facilities in Poprad or in recreational facilities in High Tatras. Inside the village are quite a few cottages and chalets for winter or summer holiday rent.

References

External links
Osturňa - The Carpathian Connection
http://www.obec-osturna.sk/ Official homepage

Villages and municipalities in Kežmarok District